The Twenty-Six Martyrs Museum and Monument were built on Nishizaka Hill in Nagasaki, Japan in June 1962 to commemorate the 100th anniversary of the canonization by the Roman Catholic Church of the Christians executed on the site on February 5, 1597. The 26 people, a mixture of 20 native Japanese Christians and six foreign priests (four Spaniards, one Mexican and one Portuguese from India) had been arrested in Kyoto and Osaka on the order of Toyotomi Hideyoshi, the national ruler, for preaching Christianity. They were imprisoned, then later marched through the snow to Nagasaki, so that their execution might serve as a deterrent to Nagasaki's large Christian population. Hung up on 26 crosses with chains and ropes, the Christians were lanced to death in front of a large crowd on Nishizaka Hill. Saint Paul Miki is said to have preached to the crowd from his cross.

The main theme inherent in both the museum and monument is "The Way to Nagasaki" – symbolising not only the physical trek to Nagasaki but also the Christian spirit of the martyrs. The museum's collection includes important historical articles from both Japan and Europe (such as original letters from the Jesuit priest St Francis Xavier) as well as modern artistic works on the early Christian period in Japan. The displays are arranged chronologically into three periods: the early Christian propagation, the martyrdoms, and the persistence of Christianity underground during the persecution.

The main monument with an extensive bronze depicting the Twenty-Six Martyrs, was designed by Japanese sculptor, Yasutake Funakoshi.  The work took Funakoshi four years to complete.

The exhibits include examples of "fumie" or treading images. Every year from 1629 to 1857, Nagasaki residents were forced to go through a ritual of stepping on bronze images of Christ or Mary to prove they were not Christians. Also to be seen are statues of the Virgin Mary in the guise of Buddhist deities such as Miroku (Hotei (Laughing Buddha)) and Kwannon Bodhisattva to which the hidden Christians prayed.

The Martyrs' altar was built as a memorial for the many people who gave up their lives. The image of a plum blossom in the centre of the altar was chosen because the plum tree blossoms in February – the month of the martyrdom of the 26 saints, who are commemorated on February 6.

See also
Buddhas of Bamyan
Martyrs of Japan
Church of Saint Mary of the Mongols
National Shrine of the Divine Mercy (Philippines)
Basilica of the Twenty-Six Holy Martyrs of Japan (Ōura Church)
Twenty-six Martyrs of Japan

External links

Museum website

Monuments and memorials in Japan
Museums in Nagasaki
Religious museums in Japan
Martyrs' monuments and memorials
Museums established in 1962
Catholic Church in Japan
1962 establishments in Japan